Juan Eckelson Cruz (1904 - death date unknown) was a Cuban baseball pitcher in the Negro leagues and Cuban League. He played with Cuban Stars (West) in 1925 and both Almendares and Habana in the winter of 1927–1928. He also played with the Providence Rubes of the Eastern League in 1926.

References

External links
 and Seamheads

1904 births
Year of death missing
Cuban Stars (West) players
Almendares (baseball) players
Habana players
Providence Rubes players
Cuban baseball players
Baseball pitchers